Jack Mewhort (born August 30, 1991) is a former American football guard who played four seasons for Indianapolis Colts of the National Football League (NFL). He played college football at Ohio State and was drafted by the Colts in the second round of the 2014 NFL Draft.

As a senior in 2013, Mewhort was named an All-American by ESPN.

Professional career

2014 NFL Draft

Indianapolis Colts
During the 2014 NFL Draft, Mewhort was selected in the 2nd round, 59 overall, by the Indianapolis Colts. Mewhort started 14 games in his rookie season, and all 16 games of the 2015 season. During the 2016 preseason, Mewhort suffered a knee injury and was expected to miss 2–4 weeks recovering. He started 10 games in 2016 before being placed on injured reserve on December 12, 2016.

In 2017, Mewhort started the first five games at right guard before suffering a knee injury. He was placed on injured reserve on October 14, 2017.

On March 21, 2018, Mewhort re-signed with the Colts.

On August 1, 2018, Mewhort announced his retirement from the NFL after four seasons with the Colts. He cited his knee problems as one of the reasons for his retirement.

References

External links
 
 Ohio State Buckeyes bio

1991 births
Living people
Sportspeople from Toledo, Ohio
Players of American football from Ohio
American football offensive tackles
American football offensive guards
Ohio State Buckeyes football players
Indianapolis Colts players